Bridgewater On Loddon is a town in north central Victoria, Australia. The town is located on the Calder Highway, north west of Bendigo, astride the Loddon River. The rural area which surrounds Bridgewater on Loddon is named simply "Bridgewater".
The Loddon Shire covers an area of approximately 6,700 square kilometres making it the seventh largest municipality (in area) in Victoria. The Shire's population is approximately 8,600. The municipality is characterised by a number of small towns dispersed throughout the area. Loddon Shire Council

The Post Office opened on 1 January 1868 as Bridgewater-on-Loddon and was renamed Bridgewater around 1941.

Bridgewater has a new swimming pool, a swimming hole and the river is about two minutes walk from the Loddon Bridge Hotel, opposite the Post Office.

When reasonable water levels flow, the Mill Rapid downstream of the Calder Hwy bridge provides technical whitewater kayaking of Grade 3 standard featuring a short fast run. This should only be attempted by kayakers with an appropriate level of experience and training and equipped at the very least with spray covers, buoyancy vests and helmets. Access is usually via local roads on the west bank. If approaching on the water from upstream, beware of entering the flour mill race area on the right (east) bank. Upstream of the Calder Hwy bridge kayakers and canoeists will have a pleasant paddling experience but may have to share the river with swimmers, fishers, and waterskiers.

The town has an Australian Rules football team competing in the Loddon Valley Football League.

Golfers play at the Bridgewater-On-Loddon Golf Club on the Calder Highway.

Schools
In 2008 Bridgewater Primary School had around 32 students; four years earlier the enrolment was 70.
In 2017 the students dropped to 23. This is due to parents working in Bendigo.

In 2018 the Bridgewater Bakehouse was awarded first place for Australia's best vanilla slice.

References

Towns in Victoria (Australia)
Shire of Loddon